Prefect (from the Latin praefectus, substantive adjectival form of praeficere: "put in front", meaning in charge) is a magisterial title of varying definition, but essentially refers to the leader of an administrative area.

A prefect's office, department, or area of control is called a prefecture, but in various post-Roman empire cases there is a prefect without a prefecture or vice versa. The words "prefect" and "prefecture" are also used, more or less conventionally, to render analogous words in other languages, especially Romance languages.

Ancient Rome

Praefectus was the formal title of many, fairly low to high-ranking officials in ancient Rome, whose authority was not embodied in their person (as it was with elected Magistrates) but conferred by delegation from a higher authority. They did have some authority in their prefecture such as controlling prisons and in civil administration.

Feudal times
Especially in Medieval Latin, præfectus was used to refer to various officers—administrative, military, judicial, etc.—usually alongside a more precise term in the vernacular (such as Burggraf, which literally means Count of the Castle in the German language).

Ecclesiastical

The term is used by the Roman Catholic Church, which based much of its canon law terminology on Roman law, in several different ways.
 The Roman Curia has the nine Prefects for the Congregations as well as the two of the Papal Household and of the Economic Affairs of the Holy See.
 The title also attaches to the heads of some Pontifical Council (central departments of the Curia), who are principally titled president, but in addition there is sometimes an additional ex officio position as a prefect. For example, the president of the Pontifical Council for Interreligious Dialogue is also the prefect of the Commission for Religious Relations with Muslims.
Traditionally these Curial officials are Cardinals, hence often called "Cardinal-Prefect" or "Cardinal-President".  There was a custom that those who were not cardinals when they were appointed were titled "Pro-Prefect" or "Pro-President". Then these officials would be appointed prefect or president after their elevation to the Sacred College. However, since 1998, this custom has fallen into disuse.
 A Prefect Apostolic is a cleric (sometimes a Titular Bishop, but normally a priest) in charge of an apostolic prefecture, a type of Roman Catholic territorial jurisdiction fulfilling the functions of a diocese, usually in a missionary area or in a country that is anti-religious, such as the People's Republic of China, but that is not yet given the status of regular diocese. It is usually destined to become one in time.

Academic
In the context of schools, a prefect is a pupil who has been given certain responsibilities in the school, similar to the responsibilities given to a hall monitor or safety patrol members.

 In some British, Irish and Commonwealth schools (especially but not exclusively private schools), prefects, usually students in fifth to seventh years (depending on how many years the school in question has), have considerable power. They were once allowed to administer school corporal punishment in some schools (now abolished in the UK and several other countries). They usually answer to a senior prefect known as the Head of School or Head Prefect or Head Boy or Head Girl or Senior Prefect. Larger schools may have a hierarchical structure with a team of prefects, a team of senior prefects, and a Head Boy and Girl. The Head Prefect may also be the School Captain if that is an appointed position in the school. This system is also practised in Hong Kong, a former British colony. Today, prefect roles in the U.K. are largely perfunctory and are mostly used to reward the better students in the year groups that qualify for prefect roles. Duties tend to be limited to door monitoring during break and representing the school at various extra-curricular events.
 In India, Pakistan, Sri Lanka, Singapore and Malaysia, prefects are student leaders in primary and secondary schools, often along the lines of other Commonwealth schools, but with superior powers. The prefect systems in these countries have changed little from when they were under the British, as the present governments have seen them as effective.
 In Bangladesh, Prefects are the leaders in Army based educational institutions namely Cadet Colleges.
 In Mexico, Prefects (in Spanish) is an adult head of a grade of a school, a US equivalent would be a dean.
 In Sweden, a prefect is the head of a university department.
 In Jesuit and other Catholic schools this title was given formerly to members of the faculty, a prefect of discipline in charge of student attendance, general order and such, and a prefect of studies in charge of academic issues.

Many college preparatory boarding schools utilize the position of prefect as a high student leadership position.

Modern sub-national administration
In Albania a prefect (Prefekti) is the State's representative in a region (qark). His agency is called the Prefektura. Albania has 12 prefects in 12 prefectures, appointed by the Prime Minister of Albania and the Government.
 In France the prefect is a top-ranking public servant who belongs to the so-called Corps préfectoral. The function was created on 17 February 1800 by Napoléon Bonaparte after his successful coup d'état of 9 November 1799 which made him head of state with the title Premier Consul. The prefect's role at that time (until the reform of the function in the 1980s) was to be the top representative of the central government as well as the chief administrator in a department (which can be compared to a county in most English-speaking nations) . The prefect's office is known as the prefecture (prefecture). Sub-prefects operate as assistants in the arrondissements (departmental subdivisions).

In the 1980s, under the presidency of François Mitterrand (1981–1995), a fundamental change in the role of the prefect (and sub-prefect) took place. The previously extremely centralized French (Fifth) Republic was gradually decentralized by the creation of administrative regions and the devolution of central state powers into regions, departments, and communes (municipalities). New elected authorities were created (e.g. the Conseils régionaux) in order to administer the subdivisional entities (collectivités territoriales) of the nation (law from 2 March 1982). 
The changes have gradually altered the function of the prefect, who is still the chief representative of the state in a department, but without the omnipotent function of chief administrator. Instead, the prefect has acquired the non-titular roles of chief controller of regional, departmental, and communal public accounts, and of chief inspector of good (i.e. law-abiding) governance of the authorities of the respective territorial entities.

A Préfet maritime is a French Admiral (Amiral) who is commissioned to be the chief commander of a Zone maritime (i.e. a section of the French territorial waters and the respective shores).

In Paris, the Préfet de police  (prefect of police) is the head of the city's police under the direct authority of the Ministre de l'Intérieur (Minister of the Interior), which makes him unique as usually in French towns and cities the chief of the local police is subordinate to the mayor, who is the local representative of the minister in police matters.

  In Italy, a prefect (prefetto) is a high-ranking public servant who belongs to the so-called Corpo prefettizio and is the State's representative in a province. His office is called Prefettura – Ufficio Territoriale del Governo. The prefects have political responsibility and coordinate the local head of the State Police (Questore), who has technical responsibility, to enforce laws when public safety is threatened. Similar offices already existed under various names before the Italian unification (1861) (e.g., in the Kingdom of Two Sicilies it was named "intendente"); in Northern Italy, it was imported from France during the Napoleonic occupation (1802). Its current form dates back to 1861, when the government of Bettino Ricasoli extended the Kingdom of Sardinia's administrative system to the entire country. In the early years the job entailed a more vigorous and vigilant application of central state authority, by enforcing regulations and dispositions in the fields of education, public works, public health, and the nomination of mayors and provincial deputies. He also plays the role of intermediary between the government and municipalities and other local governments.
 In some Spanish-speaking states in Latin America, following a French-type model introduced in Spain itself, prefects were installed as governors; remarkably, in some republics (like Peru) two levels were constructed from the French model: a prefecture and a department, the one being only part of the other.
In Greece a prefect (nomarhis, νομάρχης) used to be the elected head of one of the 54 prefectures (nomarhies, νομαρχίες), which were second-level administrative divisions, between the first-level Peripheries (periferies, περιφέρειες) and the third-level Municipalities (demoi, δήμοι), until their abolition with the Kallikratis reform in 2010. The Prefectural elections (popular ballot) would be held every four years along with the Municipal elections. The last Prefectural elections in Greece were held in October 2006.
 In Romania, a prefect (prefect) is the appointed governmental representative in a county (județ) and in the Municipality of Bucharest, in an agency called prefectură. The prefect's role is to represent the national government at local level, acting as a liaison and facilitating the implementation of National Development Plans and governing programmes at local level.
 In Québec, a warden (French: préfet) is the head of a regional county municipality.
 In Brazil, a prefect (prefeito) is the elected head of the executive branch in a municipality. Larger cities, such as São Paulo, Rio de Janeiro, Curitiba, etc., also have sub-prefects, appointed to their offices by the elected prefect.
 In Georgia, the nation in the Caucasus region, a prefect (პრეფექტი) was the head of the executive branch in a municipality, appointed by the President of Georgia from 1990 to 1992.
In Iran, a prefect is responsible for the administration of a sector in Iran's political and administrative system.

Police
In Paris, the Prefect of Police (Préfet de police) is the officer in charge of co-ordinating the city's police forces (see above under "France"). The local police in Japan are divided among prefectures too.
Also, in several countries of Latin America, the rank of prefect is still in use. In the Investigations Police of Chile (Policia de Investigaciones de Chile) the rank of prefect is reserved for the highest-ranking officers. On the other hand, in Argentina the Argentine Federal Penitentiary Service (Servicio Penitenciario Argentino) also use the rank of prefect as a high-ranking officer.

Coast Guard

Several countries of Latin America use the term "prefecture" (prefectura) to denominate a Coast Guard service, whether these are independent organizations or as a part of a navy. The Argentine Naval Prefecture it is a federal Coast Guard service of Argentina independent from the Argentine Navy. On the other hand, the National Naval Prefecture of Uruguay has similar duties to the ones of a regular Coast Guard but it is subordinated to the National Navy of Uruguay.

See also
 Pauly-Wissowa
 Praefectus palatii
 Préfet

References

External links

Catholic Hierarchy

Gubernatorial titles
Military ranks
Positions of authority
Executive branches of government
School terminology